William Hookham Carpenter (1792–1866) was a British antiquary, and Keeper of Prints at the British Museum.

Biography
Carpenter was born in Bruton Street, London on 2 March 1792. He was the son of James Carpenter, a bookseller in Old Bond Street. In 1817 Carpenter married Margaret Sarah Geddes who was a noted portrait-painter, as Margaret Sarah Carpenter. He tried painting and publishing but eventually found employment as the Keeper of Prints at the British Museum. He purchased a number of notable drawings including some by Michelangelo and Raphael.

Carpenter died at the British Museum in July 1866 and was buried with his wife Margaret (d.1872) and daughter, Henrietta (d.1895), on the western side of Highgate Cemetery. The grave (plot no. 14768) no longer has a headstone.

William and Margaret's children included two noted painters, another William and Percy Carpenter who both travelled.

References

1792 births
1866 deaths
People from London
Employees of the British Museum
British curators
People associated with the National Portrait Gallery
Burials at Highgate Cemetery